Lawrence Dale Bell High School (generally known as L.D. Bell High School and also known as Hurst Bell) is an American high school located in the cities of Hurst and Bedford, Texas and part of the Hurst-Euless-Bedford Independent School District. The school is named for Lawrence Dale Bell, the founder of nearby Bell Helicopter Textron, and was recognized as a National Blue Ribbon School for 1994–96.

L. D. Bell's marching band won the Bands of America Grand National Championship in 2007. The men's and women's gymnastics teams have won a combined total of 36 state championships since 1967.

History

L.D. Bell High School opened in 1957 at a campus on Pipeline Road. Lawrence Dale Bell High School was relocated to the current campus on Brown Trail in 1965, at a site donated to the school district by Lawrence D. "Larry" Bell, Founder and President of Bell Helicopter Textron in Fort Worth. The new location was able to accommodate a growing student population resulting from the rapid suburban growth in Hurst, Euless, Bedford, and Colleyville. The former high school grounds now house Central Junior High, the H-E-B Athletic Complex, KEYS (Keeping Eligible Youth in School) High School, and the Forrest E. Watson (F.E.W.) Center.

Preceding Jim Bannister as principal was Jim Short. Both of these men were preceded by the state legislature-commended E. Don Brown, a former president of both the National Association of Secondary School Principals (NASSP) and the Texas Association of Secondary School Principals (TASSP).

In 2002, the school was at the center of a national zero tolerance debate when an honor student was expelled for having a non-serrated bread knife in his truck-bed. A combination of federal, state, and school district rules led the Texas Education Agency to advise that the student must be expelled for one year. The superintendent then reduced the expulsion to "time served".

Campus and facilities

L. D. Bell High School moved to its present location in 1965.  Venues on the L.D. Bell High School campus include Nathan F. Danford field (baseball); a softball field; the Raider Bowl - a football field with permanent bleachers, a track, a field house, and an observation deck; a practice football field for the marching band with an observation deck; several other large football fields; and four parking lots (faculty, student, band hall and Bell Freeway Entrance (B.F.E.) / Raider Bowl). An activity center named for former principal E. Don Brown opened in 2013 with a 60-yard indoor field, offices, and locker rooms.

The northern section of the campus grounds, including all buildings, is within the Hurst City limits. The baseball diamond and most of the Raider Bowl and track are located within Bedford city limits.

L.D. Bell shares the use of district facilities such as Pennington Field for soccer, football, and marching band events and the HEB athletic field located at Central Junior High.

Student body

During the 2014–2015 school year, L. D. Bell High School enrolled 2,143 total students in grade 10 (35.5%), grade 11 (32.5%), and grade 12 (32.0%). Ethnicities represented include white (49.5%), Hispanic (27.7%), Asian and Pacific Islander (6.7%), African American (13.3%), and American Indian (0.6%). Forty percent were economically disadvantaged.

There were 600 graduates in the class of 2014.  The annual dropout rate is 0.2% (in 2013–2014).

L.D. Bell receives students from three feeder schools: all students from Bedford Junior High school and Hurst Junior High school attend Bell along with a share of the students from Central Junior High school.  Students in the attendance zones for Bedford Heights, Bellaire, Bell Manor, Donna Park, Harrison Lane, Hurst Hills, River Trails, Shady Brook, Shady Oaks, Stonegate, and West Hurst elementary schools attend L. D. Bell High School.

L.D. Bell students carry on many traditions, including "head-banging" to the drumline during pep rallies and at football games, as well as Seniors storming the gym floor at the beginning of the fight song at the end of each pep rally.

Academics

The district has offered the IB Diploma Programme and Pre-IB preparatory classes at L. D. Bell since fall 2002, graduating the first class of IB students in spring 2004. L.D. Bell students may study specialized or vocational topics—such as video production, automotive repair and service, culinary arts, computer aided drafting, and cosmetology—at the Buinger Career and Technical Education Academy.

Among L.D. Bell's class of 2014, the average SAT score was 1514 (Texas state average was 1417), and the average ACT score was 22.3 (Texas state average was 20.6). In 2007, the school had 5 National Merit Finalists.

On The Washington Post's 2016 list of America's most challenging high schools, L.D. Bell High School is ranked 1039th out of approximately 22,000 public high schools, based on a ratio of 2.445 college-level exams taken per graduate. In 2007, Newsweek used similar criteria to rank L.D. Bell as 303rd in the nation (and 4th within Tarrant County).

Among Tarrant County high schools, Bell High School ranks eleventh (of forty-six) in average points above passing on the 11th grade TAKS test.

Athletics
Despite not having freshmen on campus, the 9th graders at each feeder campus are technically eligible for varsity sports programs, and on rare occasion make the teams and participate with the high school attendees.

Football
L.D. Bell has three football teams: varsity, JV, and freshman.  For the game with rival Trinity High School, the teams alternate between home and visitor every year. The varsity football team has lost against Trinity High School in each of their last 22 games . The 1982 varsity football team was defeated in the state championship game by West Brook Senior High (Beaumont, TX). Athletes at Bell are encouraged to move at "Raider speed", which entails a "heightened sense of urgency, faster pace, and high enthusiasm".

Gymnastics
Men's Gymnastics State Championships: 1967, 1968, 1969, 1970, 1971, 1972, 1973, 1975, 1977, 1980, 1981, 1982, 1985, 1988, 1993, 2007.

The men's gymnastics team has won 16 state titles since it was founded in 1966. The Bell men's team won their sixteenth state title in 2007, their first title in 14 years.

Women's Gymnastics State Championships: 1967, 1968, 1970, 1976, 1978, 1980, 1981, 1982, 1983, 1984, 1986, 1987, 1988, 1993, 1999, 2002, 2003, 2004, 2005, 2016, 2018.

The women's gymnastics team has won 21 state championships since 1967.  The team claimed state titles from 2002 to 2005.

Baseball
Men's baseball is played on campus at Nathan F. Danford field, located along Pleasantview Dr. on the northwest corner of campus. The head baseball coach is Paul Gibson who is in his 28th year at LD Bell since 1993.  He has led the Blue Raiders to District Championships in 1995, 1996, 1999, 2004, 2005, 2008, 2011 and 2019 with additional playoff appearances in 2000, 2001, 2007, 2012, 2013, 2014 (celebrating his 400th career win) and 2018. Coach Gibson's 2011 team set new school records finishing the season 33-11 and as a Region 1-5A Finalist.  He was named “Coach of the Year” in 1995, 1996, 1999, 2002, 2004, 2005, 2008, 2011 and 2018. A winning tradition: 1969 - District Champions, 1972 - Regional Finalist, 1983 - Quarter Finalist, 1990 - Bi-District Champions, 1995 - District Champions, 1996 - District Champions, 1999 - District Champions, 2000 - Bi-District Finalist, 2001 - Bi-District Champions, 2002 - Quarter Finalist, 2004 - District Champions, 2005 - District Champions, 2007 - Bi-District Finalist, 2008 - District Champions 14–0, 2011 - 6-5A District Champions, 2011 - Regional Finalist (33-11), 2012 - Regional semifinalist, 2013 - Regional semifinalist, 2014 - Bi-District Finalist, 2018 - Area Finalist, 2019 - 3-6A Co-District Champions, 2019 - Area Finalist.

Ice Hockey
The ice hockey team plays at area ice rinks, including the Dr. Pepper Star's Centers in Euless, Grapevine, and Coppell.

Tennis 
The school has a full complement of tennis courts located between the new Don Brown Activity Center and the parking lot at the rear of the school building.  The Varsity team accepts 9th graders from the two Junior High Schools that feed L.D. Bell - Bedford Junior High and Hurst Junior High. The JV team also plays home and away games with select high schools.

Other
L.D. Bell High School also fields teams in volleyball, soccer, softball, golf and men's and women's basketball. The men's and women's soccer teams' home games are typically played at Pennington Field. Softball home games are played at the softball field on the south end of campus near the Raider Bowl.

Fine Arts / UIL Competitive Organizations

Band 
The band program at L.D. Bell splits students into four concert season bands: Sub Non-Varsity 2, Sub Non-Varsity, Non-Varsity, and Varsity.  The marching band consists of members from all four concert season bands and totals 310  students.

The marching band won the UIL State championship in 2004 and 2000.

In addition to the University Interscholastic League (UIL) competitions, the band regularly competes in independent contests (usually run by schools) and Bands of America (BOA) contests at both the regional and national levels.  In November 2007, the Bell marching band won the BOA Grand National Championship and additional awards for Outstanding Music Performance and Outstanding General Effect. In 2006, the marching band was awarded "Outstanding Musical Performance" and placed 2nd overall at the BOA Grand Nationals.  In 2004, the band won the BOA St. Louis Super-Regional and captured all captions (specific categories of judgment - music, marching, and general effect).  In other BOA Grand National competitions, the band placed 4th in 2001, 5th in 2003, 3rd in 2005, 2nd in 2006, 1st in 2007, 2nd in 2008, 2nd in 2009, 3rd in 2010, and 10th in 2013.  Since 2000, the band has medaled at 22 BOA events and 4 of 4 times at the UIL State Marching Band Contest. From 1998 to 2013, the L.D. Bell Marching Band placed in the top 5 of every contest entered.

Theatre 
The theatre department participates in several activities each year.  The UIL One act plays are competitive and advance through district, area, and state rounds.  There are also senior directed one-act plays that allow students the opportunity to direct and produce their own play.  L.D. Bell Theatre won the 1995 state championship with the UIL One Act play "Black Angel".

Dance 
The Raiderettes dance team performs at football games, basketball games, and in competitions.  Consisting only of sophomore, junior and senior girls, the Raiderettes are known for their entrance onto the field to the song, "Grand Entry Swing March", and for their traditional kick/dance to the song, "Hey, Look Me Over!"

The step team performs at all pep rallies, in addition to competing locally & nationally. The boys' step team G-phi Smooth, also known as "The Hollywood Steppers" outside of school competition, consists of sophomore, junior, and senior boys. Always known for their elaborate entrances and outros as well as themes, G-Phi Smooth has won multiple state competitions and has competed on national television, going as far as Top 35 on America's Got Talent, where they competed with the dance group "The Jabbawockeez".

Choir 
The choral program includes the Bell System show choir, an exclusive group that combines singing with dance steps and choreography. This group performs around the Dallas-Fort Worth metroplex, especially around the holiday season, when they perform at various venues such as the Fort Worth Petroleum Club, Cooks Children's Hospital, HEBISD conferences, Santa USA, Noteboom Injury Lawyers, and many others. Along with the nearly 30 shows in December alone, Bell System has its annual Showtime performance located in the L.D. Bell auditorium. In 2010, the show choir was featured on the front page of the Fort Worth Star-Telegram prior to the show in February.

The choral program is continuously recognized throughout the region and country. The choirs often receive the Sweepstakes award at UIL competitions, as well as bring home awards from annual out-of-state competitions. In 2010, the A Cappella choir was named Grand Vocal Champions in The Windy City Classic in Chicago. In October 2009, the A Cappella choir was featured on KERA Television in the Dallas-Fort Worth Area. By invitation, the choirs often perform with local orchestras and outside organizations such as the Northeast Tarrant County Orchestra. In March 2012, the choirs traveled to Italy, where they performed at St. Peter's Basilica. The program is expected to nearly double in participation in the next several years.

Speech and debate 
L.D. Bell also features a vibrant speech and debate program that was revitalized in 1995. The speech and debate organization at the school had been largely non-competitive since the early 1980s. The team has competed in Lincoln-Douglas debates and several speech events at competitions run by the Texas Forensics Association, National Forensics League, and UIL.  The Mock Trial team at L.D. Bell advanced to the Mock Trial state competition in 2013, 2014, and 2015.

Orchestra 
The Orchestra program at Lawrence Dale Bell High School is a recent and fast-growing program. With three Orchestras, Symphony, Philharmonic, and Concert, the program is quickly becoming renowned. Most notable is the Symphony Orchestra which has been nationally recognized twice and has been invited to play at Carnegie Hall.

Math 
The UIL Math program at L.D. Bell has competed in various UIL Math and Science competitions, most recently on February 16, 2020, at Valley View High School (Valley View, Texas). The Math Club is a growing program at L.D. Bell.

Notable alumni
Notable alumni are listed in chronological order by graduation (or expected graduation) year.

Awards and recognitions

References

External links
 L.D. Bell High School
 L.D. Bell Band Homepage
 L.D. Bell Football Boosters Homepage
 WFAA.com "My High School" Sports News for L.D. Bell
 Google Satellite Image of School

International Baccalaureate schools in Texas
Hurst-Euless-Bedford Independent School District high schools
Educational institutions established in 1957
1957 establishments in Texas